Lidströmer is a Swedish noble family, originating from the village of Liden, Medelpad, Sweden. Knighted 3 October 1800 by King Gustav IV Adolf in Stockholm Palace, Sweden. Jonas Lidströmer (1755–1808) was noblised on the grounds of his great innovations during late 18th century

Notable members
Jonas Lidströmer (1755–1808), inventor
Anna Fredrika Lidströmer (1780-1861), spouse of Admiral Otto Gustaf Nordenskiöld 
Fredrik August Lidströmer (1787–1856), architect
Fredrik Lidströmer (1820-1862), officer at the Swedish colony of Saint Barthélemy
August Lidströmer (1839–1915), businessman
Gustaf Lidströmer (1871–1944), county councillor
Sigrid Lidströmer (1866–1942), author
Louise Lidströmer (b. 1948), artist

Notes

Swedish noble families